Dan O’Keefe is a retired American soccer forward who played over ten seasons in the U.S. indoor leagues.  He led the American Indoor Soccer Association in scoring in 1989.

Youth
O’Keefe grew up in St. Louis where he attended McCluer High School and then attended Southern Illinois University Edwardsville where he played on the men's soccer team from 1980 to 1983.  In 1982, he led the team in scoring with thirteen goals and finished his four-year career ranked twelfth on the school's career goals list with twenty-seven.

Professional
In October 1983, the Kansas City Comets selected O’Keefe in the second round of the Major Indoor Soccer League (MISL) Draft.  In 1986, he played for the Bridgeton Soccer Club of St. Louis Played with the Fort Wayne Flames of the American Indoor Soccer Association (AISA) from 1986 to 1988.  O'Keefe briefly retired from playing following the 1988 season to coach in Jefferson City, Missouri.  He returned in 1989 to lead the AISA in goal scoring with the Indiana Kick.  In 1990, he moved from the Kick to the Detroit Rockers.  That year, the AISA renamed itself the National Professional Soccer League (NPSL).  He was selected as a first team NPSL All Star for the 1991–1992 season.  In 1992, he signed with the St. Louis Ambush.  On June 18, 1993, the Ambush traded O’Keefe to the Baltimore Spirit for Steve Boardman.  He played one season in Baltimore before returning to the Rockers in 1994.  He played only eight games in 1994–1995.  After that, there is no further record of him until an Ambush reunion game in 2005.

Fort Wayne Flames career stats

Regular season
Games Played – 65
Goals – 49
Assists – 18
Points – 67
Blocked Shots – 9
Fouls – 70
Penalty Minutes – 2

Playoffs
Games Played – 11
Goals – 14*
Assists – 7
Points – 21*
Shots on Goal – 59*
Fouls – 8
Penalty Minutes – 2.

(* = career franchise leader)

References

Soccer players from St. Louis
Major Indoor Soccer League (1978–1992) players
Kansas City Comets (original MISL) players
American Indoor Soccer Association players
Fort Wayne Flames players
Indiana Kick players
Detroit Rockers players
St. Louis Ambush (1992–2000) players
Baltimore Spirit players
SIU Edwardsville Cougars men's soccer players
Living people
Association football forwards
Year of birth missing (living people)
Association football players not categorized by nationality